Maurits Gijsbreght Hendriks (born 1 January 1961 in Amsterdam) is a field hockey coach from the Netherlands, who himself played as a goalkeeper in the 1980s in Enschede.

External links
 www.mauritshendriks.com
  Maurits Hendriks on NOC*NSF-site
  Article in NRC Handelsblad

1961 births
Living people
Dutch field hockey coaches
Field hockey players from Amsterdam
Spanish Olympic coaches
Dutch expatriate sportspeople in Spain
Dutch male field hockey players
Male field hockey goalkeepers
Dutch sports executives and administrators
AFC Ajax non-playing staff